Sadovy is a rural locality (a settlement) in Pavlovskoye Rural Settlement, Suzdalsky District, Vladimir Oblast, Russia. The population was 2,079 as of 2010. There are 27 streets.

Geography 
Sadovy is located 25 km south of Suzdal (the district's administrative centre) by road. Brodnitsy is the nearest rural locality.

References 

Rural localities in Suzdalsky District